Nicolas Popescu (born 2 January 2003) is a Romanian professional footballer who plays as a defensive midfielder for Liga I side Farul Constanța.

Club career

Farul Constanta
He made his league debut on 18 July 2021 in Liga I match against UTA Arad.

Personal life
Nicolas Popescu is the son of former Romanian international Gheorghe Popescu, the nephew of former Romanian international Gheorghe Hagi and the cousin of Ianis Hagi who plays for Rangers.

Career statistics

Club

References

External links
 
 

2003 births
Living people
Footballers from Istanbul
Romanian footballers
Romania youth international footballers
Association football midfielders
Liga I players
FC Viitorul Constanța players
FCV Farul Constanța players
FC Voluntari